Kazim Kartal (April 28, 1936 – August 13, 2003) was a Turkish film and television actor.

Biography 
Kazım Kartal, who started his art life in 1964, is the name of a very unknown hero in Turkish cinema. During his artistic career, Kartal has been involved in almost 1000 films (350 that can be identified), has written two screenplays, has undertaken a Filmin directorship.

After his illness in Erzurum, Hınıs and returning to Istanbul, he soon lost his life due to a heart attack.

Filmography 

 Toprağa Kan Düştü – 2003 
 Kirve – 2003 
 Seni Yaşatacağım – 2002 
 Derman Bey – 2001 
 O Benim Karımdı – 2001 
 Nasibim – 2001 
 Dava / Doz – 2001 
 Şişman ile Pişman – 2001 
 Üvey Baba – 2000 
 Kimsecikler – 1999 
 Şahin – 1999 
 Ölüm Yolu – 1999 
 Sokakların Yasası – 1998 
 Cinayet Var – 1998 
 Yalnızlık Şarkısı – 1997 
 Günaydın Geceyarısı – 1997 
 Sevimli Dostlar – 1997 
 Böyle mi Olacaktı – 1997 
 Fırat – 1997 
 Drejan – 1996 
 Sevda – 1996 
 Acı Ve Tatlı Günler – 1996 
 Ekmek – 1996 
 Kızım ve Ben – 1996 
 Tel Örgü – 1995 
 Yahya Kaptan – 1995 
 Huzura Giden Yol – 1995 
 Ölüm Peşimizde – 1994 
 Ölümden Acı – 1994 
 Sevgi Kuşları – 1994 
 Şöhretin Bedeli – 1994 
 İslam Adalettir – 1994 
 Adı Osman – 1994 
 Sessiz Çığlık – 1994 
 Kurtlar Sofrası – 1994 
 Ağlama Sevgilim – 1993 
 Kızılırmak Karakoyun – 1993 
 Gelincik Tarlası – 1993 
 Güneşi Uyandırmadan – 1993 
 Arayış – 1993 
 Deli Balta – 1993 
 Ben Anayım – 1992 
 Beyaz Umutlar – 1992 
 Gündüzün Karanlığı -1992 
 Tatar Ramazan Sürgünde – 1992 
 Kurdoğlu-2 / Sancağın Ordusu – 1992 
 Can mı Dayanır – 1991 
 Tanrı Şahidimdir – 1991 
 Ula Ula Niyazi – 1991 
 Ölümü Yaşamak – 1991 
 Ecelin Gölgesinde – 1991 
 Siyabend-ü Xece – 1991 
 Polis Görev Başında – 1990 
 Fedai – 1990 
 Tatar Ramazan – 1990 
 Kabadayılar Kralı – 1990 
 Kan Çiçeği – 1989 
 Atlı Karınca – 1989 
 Bir Aşk Yeter – 1989 
 Kınalı Hanzo – 1989 
 Gülom – 1989 
 Toprağın Gücü – 1988 
 Acılar −1988 
 Ponente Feneri −1988 
 Can Borcu / Nar Kırmızı -1988 
 Alman Avrat 40 Bin Mark −1988 
 Asılacak Adam −1987 
 Sürgündeki Adam −1987 
 Hazreti Ayşe −1987 
 Arkadaşım ve Ben – 1987 
 Çakırcalı Mehmet Efe – 1987 
 Efeler Diyarı – 1987 
 Işıkta Kaybolanlar – 1987 
 Oyunun Kuralı – 1987 
 Suçsuz – 1987 
 Şanssızım – 1987 
 Kuruluş / Osmancık – 1987 
 Umut Sokağı – 1986 
 Ben Milyoner Değilim – 1986 
 Kanlı Su – 1986 
 Garip (2) – 1986 
 Hekimoğlu – 1986 
 Kader Böyle İstedi – 1986 
 Manyak – 1986 
 Sevdan Öldürdü Beni – 1986 
 Seher Vakti – 1986 
 Alkol – 1985 
 Altar – 1985 
 Acı Sevda – 1985 
 Eroin Hattı – 1985 
 Gözlerden Kalbe – 1985 
 Suskun Duvarlar – 1985 
 Nokta İle Virgül Deh Deh Düldül – 1985 
 İkizler – 1985 
 Güldür Yüzümü – 1985 
 Ağlama Yarim – 1984 
 Bir Yıldız Doğuyor – 1984 
 Sonsuz Sokaklar – 1984 
 Umut Mahkûmları – 1984 
 Geçim Otobüsü – 1984 
 Halk Düşmanı – 1984 
 Çare Sende Allahım – 1984 
 Erkekçe – 1983 
 Kobra – 1983 
 Asya Ejderi – 1983 
 Gül Ağacı – 1983 
 İdamlık – 1983 
 İkimiz De Sevdik – 1983 
 Bir Zamanlar Kardeştiler – 1983 
 Doğarken Öldüm – 1983 
 Son Adam – 1983 
 Küçük Ağa – 1983 
 En Büyük Yumruk – 1983 
 Kahreden Kurşun – 1983 
 Gözüm Gibi Sevdim – 1982 
 Dört Yanım Cehennem – 1982 
 Gırgır Ali – 1982 
 Gurbet Kuşları – 1982 
 Kimsesizler – 1982 
 Sancı – 1982 
 Umut Dilencisi – 1982 
 Kelepçe – 1982 
 Aşk Pınarı – 1981 
 Azap Çiçeği – 1981 
 Dört Kardeşe Dört Gelin – 1981 
 Hamaylı Boynundayım – 1981 
 Mutlu Ol Yeter – 1981 
 Seviyorum Allahım – 1981 
 İntikam Yemini – 1981 
 Takip – 1981 
 Kader Arkadaşı – 1981 
 Destan – 1980 
 Kul Sevdası – 1980 
 Zeytin Gözlüm – 1980 
 İstanbul 1979 – 1979 
 İntikam Kadını – 1979 
 Dilberim Kıyma Bana – 1979 
 Çılgın Bakireler – 1979 
 Aşk Körfezi – 1979 
 Ahlaksız / Utanç – 1979 
 Öğren de Gel – 1979 
 Seven Sevene – 1979 
 Son Günah – 1979 
 Günah Günleri – 1979 
 Kadersizler – 1979 
 Kalleş Adam – 1979 
 Canın İsterse – 1979 
 Çıplaklar – 1979 
 Çivi Çiviyi Söker – 1979 
 Enişte – 1979 
 Günahkar Kadın – 1979 
 Haydi Bastır – 1979 
 Karanlık Sokaklar – 1979 
 Komşunun Tavuğu – 1979 
 Ölüm Emri – 1979 
 Patronun Kızları – 1979 
 Şıllık – 1979 
 Yaz Deftere – 1979 
 Aşk Kadını – 1979 
 İsmet Bu Ne Kısmet – 1978 
 Yengen – 1978 
 Hayat Kadınları – 1978 
 Kanlı Hayat – 1978 
 Ilık Dudaklar – 1978 
 Azrailin Beş Atlısı – 1978 
 Bir Garip Yabancı – 1978 
 El Bebek Gül Bebek – 1978 
 Hey Yavrum Hey – 1978 
 Kene – 1978 
 Korkusuz Aşıklar – 1978 
 Nefret – 1978 
 Ölüm Savaşı – 1978 
 Sıra Sana Gelecek – 1978 
 Sormagir Sokağı – 1978 
 Ya Bundadır Ya Şunda – 1978 
 Aşk, Arzu Ve Silah – 1977 
 Ölüm Dönemeci – 1977 
 Dört Ateşli Yosma – 1977 
 Son Gülen Tam Güler – 1977 
 Akdeniz Kartalı – 1977 
 Alman Gelin – 1977 
 Aşk Durağı – 1977 
 Bir Yiğit Gurbete Gitse – 1977 
 Cemal – 1977 
 Hıdır – 1977 
 Kanunsuz Sokak – 1977 
 Öl Seve Seve – 1977 
 Sen Aşk Nedir Bilir misin – 1977 
 Yaşamak Güzel Şey – 1977 
 Yaman Delikanlı – 1977 
 Şöhretin Bedeli – 1977 
 Şoför – 1976 
 Kadı Han – 1976 
 Su Perisi Elması – 1976 
 Elmanın Alına Bak – 1976 
 Söyleyin Anama Ağlamasın – 1976 
 Yarim İstanbul'u Mesken mi Tuttun – 1976 
 Evlatlık – - 1976 
 Sahte Kabadayı – 1976 Muhtar 
 Nereye Arkadaş – 1976 
 Kader Torbası – 1976 
 Seni Sevmekle Suçluyum – 1976 
 Babanın Oğlu – 1975 
 Tatlı Tatlı – 1975 
 Bana Beş Avrat Yetmez – 1975 
 Kral Benim – 1975 
 Namıdiğer Çolak – 1975 
 Sansar – 1975 
 Seferim Var – 1975 
 Tekerlek – 1975 
 Üç Gelin Altı Damat – 1975 
 Bil Bakalım Ne Çıkacak – 1975 
 Yırt Kazım – 1975 
 Reşo / Vatan İçin – 1974 
 Mağlup Edilemeyenler – 1974 
 Sahildeki Yabancı – 1974 
 Gün Akşam Oldu – 1974 
 Her Gece Bardayım – 1974 
 Kader – 1974 
 Karaların Ali – 1974 
 Oğul – 1974 
 Şirvan – 1974 
 Deli Ferhat – 1974 
 Erkeksen Kaçma – 1974 
 Dağ Kurdu – 1973 
 Kara Pençe – 1973 
 Tarkan: Güçlü Kahraman – 1973 
 Cengiz Han'ın Fedaisi – 1973 
 Kara Orkun – 1973 
 Kara Pençe'nin İntikamı – 1973 
 Soğukkanlılar – 1973 
 Namın Yürüsün Behçet – 1973 
 Tuzak – 1973 
 Çılgın Gangster – 1973 
 Destan – 1973 
 Evlat Acısı – 1973 
 Gecelerin Hakimi – 1973 
 Kara Çalı – 1973 
 Yaban – 1973 
 Yarını Olmayanlar – 1973 
 Yemin – 1973 
 Siyah Eldivenli Adam – 1973 
 Nefret – 1973 
 Battal Gazi Geliyor – 1973 
 Şehvet – 1972 
 Karaoğlan Geliyor – 1972 
 Dişi Akrep – 1972 
 Akma Tuna – 1972 
 Kan ve Kin – 1972 
 Büyük Bela – 1972 
 Ustura Behçet – 1972 
 Cezanı Çekeceksin – 1972 
 Cesurlar – 1972 
 Gece – 1972 
 Vur – 1972 
 Hacı Murat'ın İntikamı – 1972 
 Acı Yudum – 1972 
 Bitirim Kemal – 1972 
 Cehenneme Postalarım – 1972 
 Çoban Ali – 1972 
 Kanlı Öç – 1972 
 Kartal Tepe – 1972 
 Kuduzlar – 1972 
 Süpürgesi Yoncadan – 1972 
 Yedi Kişi Ölecek – 1972 
 Müthiş Darbe – 1972 
 Vahşetin Esirleri – 1972 
 Murat ile Nazlı – 1972 
 Çöl Kartalı – 1972 
 Kanun Adamı – 1972 
 Profesyoneller – 1971 
 Her Kurşuna Bir Ölü – 1971 
 Allı Turnam – 1971 
 Cilalı İbo Teksas Fatihi – 1971 
 Umutsuzlar – 1971 
 Killing Ölüm Saçıyor – 1971 
 Kartallar – 1971 
 Cilalı İbo Yetimler Meleği – 1971 
 Gelin Çiçeği – 1971 
 Önce Sev Sonra Öldür – 1971 
 Kurşunla Selamlarım – 1971 
 Zehir Hafiye – 1971 
 Allah Benimle – 1971 
 Kadırgalı Ali – 1971 
 Kanunsuz Yaşayanlar – 1971 
 Ölümden Korkmuyorum – 1971 
 Şahinler Diyarı – 1971 
 Zagor Kara Korsanın Hazineleri – 1971 
 Bir Çuval Para – 1970 
 Zagor – 1970 
 Aşk Sürgünü – 1970 
 Deliormanlı – 1970 
 Donanma Kamil – 1970 
 Ecelin Gölgesinde – 1970 
 Gülüm Nuri – 1970 
 Kan ve Kurşun – 1970 
 Kralların Kaderi – 1970 
 Yemen'de Bir Avuç Türk – 1970 
 Yeşil Kurbağalar – 1970 
 Son Günah – 1970 
 Mazi Kalbimde Yaradır – 1970 
 Cilalı İbo Almanya'da – 1970 
 Dikenli Hayat – 1969 
 Hayırsız Evlat – 1969 
 Ringo Vadiler Kaplanı – 1969 
 Şirvan – 1969 
 Talihsiz Gelin – 1969 
 Dağa Çıkan Kız – 1969 
 Beyaz Mendilim – 1969 
 Bir Türk'e Gönül Verdim – 1969 
 Sabrın Sonu – 1969 
 Şeytanın Oyunu – 1969 
 Bir Vefasız Yar İçin – 1969 
 Ağlama Değmez Hayat – 1969 
 Dişi Eşkıya – 1969 
 Kaderimsin – 1969 
 Tel Örgü – 1969 
 Bataklı Damın Kızı Aysel – 1969 
 Sabah Olmasın – 1969 
 Aşk Bu Değil – 1969 
 Kara Güneş – 1968 
 Şeyh Ahmet Şeyhin Oğlu – 1968 
 Urfa İstanbul – 1968 
 Yedi Köyün Zeynebi – 1968 
 Beşikteki Miras – 1968 
 Dertli Pınar – 1968 
 Kocadağlı – 1967 
 Silahları Ellerinde Öldüler – 1967 
 Göklerdeki Sevgili – 1966 
 O Kadın – 1966 
 Konyakçı – 1965 
 Severek Ölenler – 1965 
 Kasımpaşalı – 1965 
 Tehlikeli Adam – 1965 
 Elveda Sevgilim – 1965 
 Vatansız Haydut – 1964 
 Anadolu Çocuğu – 1964 
 Mor Defter – 1964 
 Hancının Kızı – 1963

References

External links 
 

1936 births
2003 deaths
20th-century Turkish male actors
Turkish_male_film_actors
Turkish_male_television_actors
21st-century Turkish male actors